Club Deportivo Águila, commonly known as Águila, is a Salvadoran football club based in San Miguel, El Salvador. The club currently plays in the Primera División, the top tier of the El Salvador football league system.

Águila is one of the most successful clubs in El Salvador football history.
C.D. Águila have won sixteen Primera División championships, one Copa Presidente, and one CONCACAF Champions' Cup 1976. Their CONCACAF Champions' Cup 1976 win made them the second Salvadoran team to win a CONCACAF title.

Since 1956, Águila have played their home games at Estadio Juan Francisco Barraza. The stadium is one of the biggest stadiums in El Salvador.

Aguila is one of the most widely supported football clubs in El Salvador, and has long standing rivalry with neighbours Dragón, known as the San Miguel derby, and also competes with powerclub FAS, known as El Clásico (English: The Classic).

History

Foundation and early years
Club Deportivo Águila was founded on 15 February 1926, in the City of San Miguel, by a group of young people. The first club President was Victor Vanegas.
The major goal of the club was first to establish a baseball team, and later develop football and basketball teams. At the beginning, baseball and football were not as successful as basketball with the team dominating in both El Salvador as in neighbouring countries.

In 1956, a group met in San Miguel and decided to form a football team named Club Deportivo Águila. Their first act was to meet with the president of Alacranes, Miguel Sagastizado, after sometime negotiating, they purchased their spot in Liga B and this was ratified by FESFUT on 21 August 1956. In the first season the club played under the name of CD A, this was due to another club in the division Águilas FC from Santa Tecla having a similar name.
To attract big names players the clubs paid a minimum of 75 colones per month (US$8), which was above the average of their three biggest rivals (Dragon Rácing and Corona) paid their players per month, which was around 30 to 50 colones (US$3.40 – 5.70). This allowed them to signed players such as Juan Francisco Barraza, Esteban Blanco, Salvador Hernández, Fito Fuentes, Juan Merthem, Atilio Pineda, Honduran Manuel Larios, Saul Molina and Rodolfo Fuentes. This came at great cost professionally as FESFUT barred the players to play for the national team as no second division players were allowed to represent the national team.
They hired Argentinian Agustin Noriega who previously coached Guatemalan club like Guatemala Deportiva.
CD A first game was a 2–2 all draw with Titan, with Juan Antonio "Maquinita" Merlos scoring both goals, by the end of the season Juan Merlos was the team leading scorer with 16 goals.

During its time in the lower leagues, it fought for the affections of the San Miguel people alongside rival Dragón, but when they were promoted to the Liga, it attracted a following not only from San Miguel but also from the entire country. Proof of this was demonstrated by the fact that the teams sold more tickets when the local club played against Águila.

First titles
After two years in the Liga B (Segunda Division), Aguila qualified to Championship/Promotional series against Atlético Constancia (Currently known as Alianza F.C. Aguila won the first game 2–0, thanks to a double from Juan Antonio Merlos, and after 0–0 draw in the second leg. Aguila were promoted to the first division for the first time in the club history.
In their very first campaign, Under the tutelage of Conrado Miranda, Aguila won their first titles thank to combination of based players Juan Francisco Barraza, Juan Antonio Merlos and Saul Molina, and the incorporation of Costa Rican Fernando Jiménez. They became the first club to win a title after gaining promotion, only two other clubs have done that in the history of Primera Division (C.D. Platense Municipal Zacatecoluca and C.D. Vista Hermosa).

Titles
C.D. Águila ranks second in the number of championships won in El Salvador with fifteen titles. The two most successful managers in the club history are Conrado Miranda (1959, 1975, 1976) and Argentinian Hugo Coria (Apertura 1999, Apertura 2000, Clausura 2001) with three titles each, Juan Francisco Barraza (1972, 1983) and Victor Manuel Ochoa (1963, 1964) with two titles each, while Honduran Carlos Padilla (1960), Brazilian Zózimo (1968), Chilean Hernán Carrasco Vivanco (1986) and Serbian-Salvadoran Vladan Vićević (Clausura 2006) won one title each. They were also winners of the Copa President in 2000 and won the CONCACAF Champions League.

The members of the team that conquered the first championship in 1959 were Luis Alberto López, Rodolfo Fuentes, Justiniano Jiménez, Manuel Larios, Raúl Vásquez, Raúl Bonilla, Raúl Lizano, Juan Francisco Barraza, Juan Antonio Merlos, and Saúl Molina.

Sponsorship
Companies that Águila currently has sponsorship deals with for 2023–2024 includes:
 Umbro – Official Kit Suppliers
 Tigo – Official sponsors
 Pepsi – Official sponsors
 Gatorade – Official sponsors
 Mister donut – Official sponsors
 Canal 4 – Official sponsors
 La Pampa El Volcan – Official sponsors
 Supamercado Costa del Sol – Official sponsors
 Las Perlitas – Official sponsors
 Acodjar – Official sponsors

Stadium
 Estadio Juan Francisco Barraza (1956–Present)
 Estadio Cuscatlán; San Salvador (2012, 2016–2017) games in the CONCACAF Champions League and played in Clausura 2016 during Estadio Juan Francisco Barraza renovation.
 Estadio Flor Blanca; San Salvador (TBD) International games prior to the building of Estadio Cuscatlán

Águila plays its home games at Estadio Juan Francisco Barraza located in San Miguel. The stadium has a capacity of 10,000 people.

Colours and crest
Since the club foundation the clubs have always played in orange with black stripes shirt, black shorts and orange socks.   While the club alternative kit is Black with Orange stripes.

 Home

 Away

Statistics and records

TBD holds the record for most Águila appearances, having played TBD first-team matches from TBD to TBD. The record for Águila's most capped international player is Rudis Corrales with 77 caps (33 while at the club), Arnold Cruz of Honduras is Águila's most capped foreign international player with 55 caps.

Luis Ramírez Zapata is Águila's all-time top goalscorer, with 184 goals. other players have also scored over 100 goals for Águila: Hugo Coria and the previous goalscoring record-holder Félix Pineda (1971–1983).

Rivalries
Águila's biggest rivalries are with Alianza, Luis Ángel Firpo and FAS. 
Together, these teams form the "Big Four" of Salvadoran football, and are the primary title contenders each season.

The rivalry stems not only from their competitiveness, but from the economic, political, and cultural clashes between the cities of San Miguel, Santa Ana and San Salvador, where the other three clubs are based.

El Clásico
Of those rivalries, Águila's rivalry with FAS is the strongest and most passionate.  That rivalry is traditionally referred to as El Clásico.  The first in the series took place on 17 May 1959, and ended in a 1–1 draw.  As of the end of the 2016 Clausura season, the clubs have faced each other in 224 competitive matches, which have resulted in 68 wins for Águila, 87 for FAS and 68 draws.

El Derbi Migueleño
The rivalry between Aguila and Dragón due to the fact that both teams are based in San Miguel. 

The intense feelings between the two sides began early on due to the close proximity and the switching of players between the clubs. The biggest defection occurred in the 1950s when legendary players Juan Francisco Barraza and left the championship side of Dragon to Aguila and started a dynasty. The sole final played between the two teams ended 1–0 to Dragon. The most recent match was a 1-0 victory by Dragon on the 15th of February, 2023.
The teams have played 81 matches in all competitions, Aguila winning 46, Dragon 12, and the remaining 23 having been drawn.

Honours
Águila is historically the third most successful team in El Salvador football, as they have won the second most championships. They are also one of El Salvador's most successful team in international competitions, having won one trophy. Águila is one of only three clubs to have won the CONCACAF Champions' Cup.

Domestic honours

Leagues
Primera División Salvadorean and predecessors 
 Champions (16) : 1959, 1960–61, 1963–64, 1964, 1967–68, 1972, 1975–76, 1976–77, 1983, 1987–88, Apertura 1999, Apertura 2000, Clausura 2001, Clausura 2006, Clausura 2012, Clausura 2019
 Segunda División Salvadorean and predecessors 
 Champions (1) : 1958
 Tercera División Salvadorean and predecessors 
 Champions (1) : 1950

Cups
 Copa President and predecessors 
 Champions (1) : 1999–2000
 Campeón de Campeones
 Winners (1): 2018–2019

CONCACAF
 CONCACAF Champions' Cup 
 Champions (1) : 1976
 UNCAF Interclub Cup 
 Runners up (1) : 1973

Current squad
Updated 5 February 2023

Players with dual citizenship
   Gerson Mayen
   Allexon Saravia
   Victor Rafael Garcia

Out on loan

In

Out

Youth League squad
Águila's youth squad plays in the ten-team Primera División Reserves (El Salvador). Current members of the squad are:
As of February 2023

Personnel

Coaching staff
As of September 2022

Management
As of January 2022

Presidential history
Aguila have had numerous presidents over the course of their history, some of which have been the owners of the club, others have been honorary presidents, here is a complete list of them.
<div style="font-size:100%">

Notable players

World Cup winners
Players that have played for Águila in their career and won a World Cup:
 Zózimo (Sweden 1958 & Chile 1962)

South American Championship runners-up
Players that have played for Águila in their career and finished up as runners-up South American Championship:
 Zózimo (1957 South American Championship)

World Cup Players
Players that have played for Águila in their career and played in a World Cup:
 Zózimo
 Mario Castillo
 Luis Guevara Mora
 José Francisco Jovel
 Juan Ramón Martínez
 Sergio Méndez
 Saturnino Osorio
 Joaquín Ventura
 Luis Ramírez Zapata
 Ramón Maradiaga

Team captains

Head coaches

Aguila has had various coaches since its formation in 1956. In 1956, Argentinian Gregorio Bundio Núñez became the club's first full-time head coach.
Conrado Miranda is the club's most successful coach, having won three Primera División titles, and one CONCACAF Champions' Cup 1976, followed closely by Hugo Coria who won two primera titles, and won Copa Presidente 1999–2000, and Victor Manuel Ochoa who won two titles as well.
Hugo Coria has served five terms as head coach.

Kit makers

Other departments

Football

Reserve team
The reserve team serves mainly as the final stepping stone for promising young players under the age of 21 before being promoted to the main team. The second team is coached by TBD. the team played in the Primera División Reserves, their greatest successes were winning the Reserve championships in Clausura 2017, Apertura 2017, Clausura 2019.

Junior teams
The youth team (under 17 and under 15) has produced some of El Salvador's top football players, including TBD and TBD. The Under 17 finished 3rd place at the 2018 UNCAF U-17 Interclub Cup, the highest finish internationally done by a Salvadoran team in that age range.

Women's team
The women's first team, which is led by head coach TBD, features several members of the El Salvador national ladies team. Their greatest successes were reaching the semi finals the in Apertura 2020.

Other sports
Aguila has other departments for a variety of sports.

Basketball
Aguila Básquetbol Club or Águila BC for short was founded on TBD and play Liga Mayor de Baloncesto (LMB) which is the highest level in El Salvador league tier. the club is led by head coach Argentinian Pablo Epeloa, the club features several key members including American Marquise Mosley and TBD. Their greatest successes were winning the 2015 Apertura and the Clausura 2022. 

They currently play the Cancha Alvarez y Biblioteca e Infocentro Muncipal, San Miguel.
Previous coach:  Roberto Carrillo
Notable players:

Baseball
Aguila Béisbol Club was founded in 2016 and play Liga Nacional de Béisbol (LNB) which is the highest level in El Salvador league tier. the club is led by head coach Venezuelan Jesús Cartagena, the club features several key members including Puerto Rican Bryan Vásquez  and TBD. Their greatest successes was TBD

Volleyball
Aguila Voleibol Club was founded in 2016 and play Campeonaro Nacional which is the highest level in El Salvador league tier. the club is led by head coach TBD, the club features several key members including TBD and TBD. Their greatest successes were reaching the TBD.

References

External links
Official website 
Official Foundation website 
Fan website 
El Nido Aguilucho Fan website 
At El Grafico

 
Association football clubs established in 1926
Aguila
1926 establishments in El Salvador
San Miguel, El Salvador
A